Edmond v. United States, 520 U.S. 651 (1997), was a decision by the Supreme Court of the United States on the status of members of the Coast Guard Court of Criminal Appeals under the Appointments Clause.

References

External links
 

 
1997 in United States case law
Appointments Clause case law
United States administrative case law
United States separation of powers case law
United States Supreme Court cases
United States Supreme Court cases of the Rehnquist Court